Harold W. Furchtgott-Roth (born December 13, 1956) is an American economist who served as a Commissioner of the Federal Communications Commission from 1997 to 2001.

References

External links

1956 births
Living people
Members of the Federal Communications Commission
Tennessee Republicans
Clinton administration personnel
George W. Bush administration personnel